Minuscule 760 (in the Gregory-Aland numbering), ε475 (von Soden), is a Greek minuscule manuscript of the New Testament written on parchment. Palaeographically it has been assigned to the 12th century.  Scrivener labelled it as 849e.

Description 
The codex contains the text of the four Gospels, on 283 parchment leaves (size ). The text is written in one column per page, 21-23 lines per page.

There is also another division according to the smaller Ammonian Sections (in Mark 232 Sections, last in 16:8), without references to the Eusebian Canons.

It contains Eusebian tables at the beginning, subscriptions at the end of each Gospel, and pictures.
The manuscript is ornamented.

Text 
The Greek text of the codex is a representative of the Byzantine text-type. Hermann von Soden classified it to the Antiocheian commentated text (Ak), it means the Byzantine commentated text. Aland placed it in Category V.

According to the Claremont Profile Method it represents textual family Kx in Luke 1 and Luke 10. In Luke 20 it represents textual family Πb. It creates cluster with 281 in Luke 1 and Luke 10.

History 
Scrivener dated the manuscript to the 14th century; Gregory dated the manuscript to the 12th century. The manuscript is currently dated by the INTF to the 12th century.

In 1876 it was signalled in catalogue of Cremus.

It was added to the list of New Testament manuscripts by Scrivener (849) and Gregory (760). Gregory saw the manuscript in 1886.

The manuscript is now housed at the National Library of Greece (153) in Athens.

See also 

 List of New Testament minuscules
 Biblical manuscript
 Textual criticism
 Minuscule 759

References

Further reading

External links 
 Minuscule 760 Images online at the CSNTM.

Greek New Testament minuscules
12th-century biblical manuscripts
Manuscripts of the National Library of Greece